Cantemir or Kantemir may refer to:

People 

 Moldavia's Cantemirești dynasty:
Antioh Cantemir (1670-1726), son of Constantin Cantemir, Voivode of Moldavia
Antiokh Dmitrievich Kantemir (1708-1744), son of Dimitrie Cantemir, man of letters and Russian diplomat
Constantin Cantemir (1614–1693), Voivode of Moldavia
Dimitrie Cantemir (1673–1723), son of Constantin Cantemir, Voivode of Moldavia and a prolific man of letters
Maria Dmitrievna Cantemirovna (1700–1754), daughter of Dimitrie Cantemir - Romanian noble, lady-in-waiting, salonist and a mistress of Tsar Peter the Great
Kantemir Balagov (born 1991), Russian filmmaker
Kantemir Berkhamov (born 1988), Russian footballer

Places 
Cantemir, Moldova, a city in the Republic of Moldova
Cantemir, Oradea, a quarter/district of the city of Oradea, Romania
Budu Cantemir
Cantemir District, a district in the south of Moldova
Cantemir metropolitan area
Cantemir Palace in Istanbul

Other 
 Kantemir (film), a horror movie starring Robert Englund